Franklin Commonwealth Marine Reserve is a 671 km2 marine protected area within Australian waters located off the west coast of north-west Tasmania. The reserve was established in 2007 and is part of the South-east Commonwealth Marine Reserve Network.

The area incorporates two major bioregions: western Bass Strait and the Tasmanian shelf. To the north of the reserve is Black Pyramid Rock, which supports the largest breeding colony of the Australasian gannet in Tasmania.

Protection
The entirety of the Franklin marine reserve area is IUCN protected area category VI and zoned as 'Multiple Use'.

See also

 Commonwealth marine reserves
 Protected areas of Australia
 Great Australian Bight

Notes

References

External links
 Franklin Commonwealth Marine Reserve Network website

South-east Commonwealth Marine Reserves Network
Protected areas established in 2007